Mama's Family is an American sitcom television series starring Vicki Lawrence as Mama (Thelma Harper). The series is a spin-off of a recurring series of comedy sketches called "The Family" featured on The Carol Burnett Show (1967–78) and Carol Burnett & Company (1979). The sketches led to the television film Eunice, and finally the television series.

Mama's Family aired on NBC, debuting on January 22, 1983. After several timeslot changes and a subsequent drop in ratings, the network cancelled the series; the final episode of this two-season NBC incarnation of the series aired on April 7, 1984. NBC broadcast reruns until September 1985, which unexpectedly performed well in ratings.

Two years after its cancellation, original series producer Joe Hamilton Productions (JHP) revived Mama's Family for new episodes in first-run syndication on local stations across the United States. The reincarnation,  distributed by Lorimar-Telepictures, premiered on September 27, 1986. The modified four-season series revival garnered substantially higher ratings than its first incarnation, eventually becoming the highest-rated sitcom in first-run syndication, with its final episode airing on February 24, 1990.

The show's theme song is "Bless My Happy Home," created as an a cappella by Lawrence. The show's producers chose to use an instrumental of Lawrence's song composed by Peter Matz. Disclosing the lyrics to the song as part of her Vicki and Mama: A Two Woman Show (untelevised stand-up comedy routine Lawrence has hosted as herself and Mama since 2001), Lawrence routinely performs the song in its original a cappella form. The lyrics were also featured in an advertisement for the show on MeTV.

Overview
The show is set in the city of Raytown, which actress Vicki Lawrence later revealed to be Raytown, Missouri, a suburb of Kansas City (although the script writing suggests the setting was Raytown, Mississippi, given the rural southern nature of the series). The television series revolves around the wacky misadventures of the Harper family, extended non-Harper family members and their neighbor friend in later seasons. Always at the center of all the trouble, turmoil and misunderstandings is head of the clan and matriarch Thelma Harper (Mama)—a thickset, gray-haired, purse-lipped, mid-to-late 60s widow who is portrayed as explosively quick-tempered, abrasive, and brash.

Mama's snappy retorts and wisecracks are featured in a running gag in which the final scene of each episode cuts to an exterior shot of her residence (1027 Montrose Avenue in South Pasadena, which was also the house of Lynda’s character in the 1978 film Halloween. The home was only featured briefly in the film where Lynda walks toward the front door) while Mama's voice is heard making a sharp or witty reply to whoever had previously spoken. This is then followed by audience laughter and applause. In spite of Thelma's derogatory attitude, regular zingers and sarcasm, she is nurturing and obliging at heart, allowing family members to live off her in her home who would otherwise have no place to live, while also regularly cooking for and cleaning up after them. Thelma's family members can be ingrates, even ganging up on her occasionally.

Network run (seasons 1–2)

Beginning the series
In the ninth season of The Carol Burnett Show, producer Joe Hamilton wanted to spin off Mama into her own series, but Lawrence turned him down. She did not wish to wear a "fat suit portraying an old lady every week," and she had misgivings about playing the role without Harvey Korman (who played Mama's son-in-law, Ed Higgins) and Carol Burnett (who played Mama's daughter Eunice Higgins) regularly by her side as in "The Family" sketches. Burnett and Korman told Lawrence that they would only appear as guest stars on the new series, and that it was Lawrence's time to shine and take what she had learned from The Carol Burnett Show and make it on her own. Shortly after the highly-rated Eunice TV movie, with continued urging by Korman and Burnett, Lawrence finally changed her mind and accepted the offer for her character's own sitcom.

The writers had created Raytown to be its own "cartoon-like" world outside of reality. Although the series was sold to NBC without a pilot, the network had its own requirements, such as having "normal" teenagers as seen in other sitcoms of the time, which is how the Buzz and Sonja characters came about. However, Lawrence had a great deal of creative input and made many important decisions, including bringing in Korman very early on to co-direct the series. Lawrence objected to the original script of the episode "Mama Cries Uncle", in which Thelma's brother-in-law visits and the two supposedly wound up sleeping together:

According to her autobiography, Lawrence had a problem with the decision to tape the series on Stage 33 at CBS Television City, where The Carol Burnett Show was produced.

Plot details
For 1½ seasons from 1983 through 1984, Mama's Family ran on NBC. In the series' first episode, Thelma Harper lives with her uncomfortable, uptight spinster sister Fran (Rue McClanahan), a journalist for a local paper. Thelma's son Vinton (whose wife Mitzi had left him to become a cocktail waitress in Las Vegas) arrives to inform Thelma that he and his two children, Sonja and Buzz, have been evicted from their home and need a place to stay. Much to Fran's chagrin, Thelma allows the trio to move in.

During the first season, Vinton forged a relationship with the Harpers' flirtatious next-door neighbor Naomi Oates, whom Thelma disliked, and soon married her. After selling Naomi's house and losing the money in a bad business deal, Naomi and Vint are forced to move into Thelma's basement, where they remain for most of the show's run. Also seen on a recurring basis were Thelma's two daughters: the snobbish Ellen (Betty White) and the ornery Eunice (Carol Burnett). Harvey Korman, who directed many of the earlier episodes, made featured appearances as Eunice's husband, Ed Higgins. (During the eleventh and final season of The Carol Burnett Show, the Ed Higgins character left Eunice and was written out of "The Family" skits.)

Opening theme discrepancies
Korman appeared at the beginning of each episode as the stuffed shirt Alistair Quince (a parody of Alistair Cooke), who would soberly introduce the program in the style of Masterpiece Theatre. These monologs were cut out of the later syndicated reruns. Korman also performed the voice of Thelma's unseen late husband, Carl, in flashback episodes.

An extended version of the show's opening theme song, with repeated melodies, was used during the original NBC run, but was never used in reruns.

The house and neighborhood shown in the opening credits differed between the original NBC run  and the syndicated run (1027 Montrose Avenue in South Pasadena, which was also the house of Lynda’s character in the 1978 film Halloween. The home was only featured briefly in the film where Lynda walks toward the front door), leading to discrepancies such as in the episode "Mama for Mayor", in which Mama is shown in front of a house similar to the one used in the original opening theme of the first two seasons, though there are noticeable differences as it's not the same house.

In 2013, StarVista Entertainment released the original NBC seasons with the Alistair Quince intros and original opening credits intact, except for two episodes in Season 1 ("Cellmates" and "Mama's Boyfriend"), as the master prints of those episodes are lost and were replaced by the syndicated version in the re-release.

Cancellation
While not a huge ratings success, the first season garnered solid enough numbers to justify being renewed for a second season. For instance, the premiere episode ranked #25 for the week with an 18.6 rating and a 28 share. However, during the second season, the show dropped out of the top 50 shows, losing share to CBS' hit Magnum, P.I. As a result, NBC canceled the series in May 1984.

First-run syndication (Seasons 3–6)

Series rebirth
After Mama's Family was canceled by NBC in 1984, it was later relaunched in first-run syndication in 1986. Lorimar Television had just merged with Telepictures and were looking for new projects for the then newly commenced first-run syndication market. After observing high ratings for NBC's Mama's Family in summer reruns, production staff decided that the show deserved a second chance and ordered 100 episodes for syndication.

Plot details
Since the original set had been destroyed, a new set had to be constructed. This led to some significant changes in set design details. Adjustments in the show's cast occurred as well, with only Vicki Lawrence (Thelma), Ken Berry (Vinton), and Dorothy Lyman (Naomi) returning as regulars from the original era of the sitcom. Vinton's kids from his first marriage, Buzz (Eric Brown) and Sonja (Karin Argoud), who were regulars in the show's first life, did not reprise their roles for the show's revival; their characters, though mentioned briefly in the first episode of the show's syndicated life, were never to be spoken of again.

During the hiatus of the series, both Rue McClanahan and Betty White had gone on to star in the NBC sitcom The Golden Girls, rendering them unavailable to return. White, however, did return as Ellen for one episode in 1986 while Fran was killed off in the first episode of the revival. Carol Burnett and Harvey Korman, meanwhile, did not reprise their roles either, resulting in their characters (Eunice and Ed Higgins) being written out as having moved to Florida.

To fill the void left by Mama's grandchildren, Allan Kayser was cast as Thelma's delinquent teenage grandson Bubba Higgins, Ed and Eunice's son. Bubba was ordered to live with his grandmother after being released from juvenile hall and placed on probation as Thelma was not pleased that Eunice and Ed forgot their own son. Also added to the cast was Beverly Archer, who played the new character of Iola Boylen, the family's wildly quirky and prissy neighbor and Mama's best friend. Her catchphrase was calling out "Knock, knock!" in place of ringing the doorbell.

Absence of Carol Burnett as the "Eunice" character
According to Lawrence's autobiography, Vicki!: The True-Life Adventures of Miss Fireball, Burnett resented Lawrence for accepting the role of Mama for first-run syndication with producer Joe Hamilton (who owned the Mama's Family characters). It was during this time that Burnett was involved in an acrimonious divorce from Hamilton, who produced both The Carol Burnett Show and Mama's Family. Burnett felt Lawrence had been disloyal to her and held a grudge against her until Hamilton's death in 1991. Sometime after Hamilton's death, Burnett and Lawrence reconciled. Lawrence's autobiography reads:

Series end
After Mama's Family was picked up in first-run syndication, ratings for the series improved, becoming the highest-rated first-run program in syndication. According to Ken Berry, Lawrence had seemingly grown tired of playing the "Mama" role by 1990 and wanted to end the show. According to Lawrence, who would reprise Mama on stage for many years thereafter, the series ended because it had reached the standard threshold of 100 episodes and no longer needed to produce anymore. The series finale featured Naomi giving birth to a baby girl, who was named Tiffany Thelma.

Cast and characters

Thelma Mae Crowley Harper (Mama)

Role
Thelma Harper, better known as Mama, is the title character/main character of Mama's Family. Despite the title of "Mama," few characters in the sitcom actually refer to Thelma as Mama. Thelma plays a variety of roles in the series, including grandmother, mother-in-law, sister, neighbor friend, and mother, depending on the supporting character in question.

Thelma is the widowed matriarch of a rural Southern family. She is an elderly country woman in her mid-to-late 60s, who speaks in a southern drawl. Always active with housework and the nurturance of her family, Mama is usually seen cooking, cleaning, and providing (begrudgingly) support to her family.

Appearance
Mama's appearance is based on that of a stereotypical elderly woman. She is a thickset, purse-lipped widow with silvery gray curls. All of her daytime outfits were short-sleeved, floral-print dresses with lace collars. Costumer Ret Turner color-coded Mama in flowery colors, mainly mixtures of blues, greens and lavenders.  As much of Mama's time was spent cooking and cleaning, she often wore overlapping aprons over her dresses. Mama's lower legs were always enveloped by visible support hose (a feature that was nonexistent during "The Family" sketches, but made its first appearance when she donned them during a segment of the 1973 Eunice movie). For footwear, Mama regularly wore white orthopedic, colonial shoes that took an Alfred J. Cammeyer evening oxford heels style.

Mama regularly wore a few fashion accessories, including a white pearl necklace, white pearl earrings as well as a wristwatch. 
 
Mama's outerwear worn when visiting public venues always consisted of the same purple sweater, draped casually over her shoulders without arms in the sleeves; headpieces made completely of artificial plant petals; and a white purse, which she didn't hesitate to use as a weapon when given the opportunity.

Persona evolution
In contrast to her more stereotypically elderly, dependent, invariably spiteful and cantankerous character on "The Family" skits, Mama's hostilities were significantly toned down in the sitcom's first life. Though still cantankerous, the character expanded with wisecracks and humor, pesky antics, unseemliness and naivete. Mama's unseemliness and naivete were exemplified by her inability to drive (episode "Mama Learns to Drive"); inability to act in socially acceptable ways in public and in the presence of guests (episodes "The Mama Who Came to Dinner", "Country Club" and "Ellen's Boyfriend"); inability to hold jobs outside the home (episodes "Mama Gets a Job", "Supermarket" and "Mama for Mayor"); etc. These characteristics often resulted in the humiliation or frustration of her loved ones.

By the show's second life, Mama was no longer naive (Vinton overwhelmingly assumed this role) and far more capable of high spirits than ever before. This version of Mama had the fewest stereotypically elderly traits. She was dutiful in caring for her home, garden and family; independent; and active in the community along with best friend Iola Boylen. For example, Mama returned to high school and graduated (episodes "Educating Mama," "Teacher's Pet," and "Pomp and Circumstance"); she was heavily involved in the Church Ladies League and at one point its president (episode "Where There's Smoke"); Mama participated in dirty dancing (episode "Very Dirty Dancing"); went on a trip (episode "Mama Goes Hawaiian"), etc. Highlighting her much more relaxed nature during the syndicated seasons, Mama's main character trait during this time was her many fretful wisecracks, typically made in a high-pitched, whiny voice. Despite that, this era of Mama was more derogatory than ever; rough, abrasive and brash in manner; volatile and explosive in temper; and smart-mouthed with a proneness for making snappy retorts.

Unlike the preceding sketch comedy and television movie, Thelma had many characteristic expressions on the program, "Good Lord!" being her most frequently used. She occasionally stated this in alternate ways, such as "Good Lord in heaven!" "Well Good Lord!" "Good heavens!" or "Good night Louise!" Among her additional expressions included "Horse pucky!" "The hell you say!" "Hell's bells!" "(insert the sender's claim or statement here) my aunt Fanny!" "Now hear this," "God-awful," "In a pig's eye!" "In a pig's patoot!" "Shoot!" "For crying out loud!" "For pity's sake!" "For heaven's sake!" "Real good!" (sarcastically) etc. Disparaging and impudent, Thelma had a series of name-calling catchphrases she often used to refer to certain members of her family or her family as a whole, such as "Nitwit," "Dimwit," "Goon," "Goober goon," "Lamebrain," "Dunce," "Tramp," "Floozy," etc.

Vicki Lawrence on evolution of Mama
Vicki Lawrence has stated that at the beginning of Mama's Family, she noticed that the writers had made adjustments to her character from "The Family" skits, significantly toning down Mama's hostilities and nastiness. Lawrence originally disapproved of the change in character, believing that toning down her then-familiar aggression and spite into a less difficult, more agreeable Mama, capable of humor and high spirits, would not be funny.

Lawrence has revealed, however, that after counsel from Harvey Korman that the character needed to be reshaped for sitcom television, she came to accept the adjustments made to "Mama". Korman suggested that Mama had to be less one-dimensionally hostile because the entire show would revolve around her—that more characteristics would need to be added into the mix. Korman's opinion was that people could not be expected to come home from work, pop a beer, and put up their feet to a character who was so one-dimensional; she would have to be more than just disagreeable for a whole half hour, or viewers would become bored after awhile. According to Korman, silly elements needed to be added to the character.

Lawrence has stated that it took her a while to warm up to this, but that she later came to greatly appreciate how Mama "blossomed" and "matured" from her early years on "The Family". She added that she still favors the adjustments in Mama's character and partly credits Korman with who Thelma Harper is today. "The Family" sketch writers, however,   who had based "The Family" characters on their own family members, disliked the less aggressive Mama designed for sitcom television. In February 2013, Lawrence also remarked that "The Family" sketch version of Mama was created by writers (Dick Clair and Jenna McMahon) who hated their mothers. Clair and McMahon also created and wrote for Mama's Family.

Family members and friends

Harper family tree

Magenta = Crowleys
Orange = Harpers
Blue = Harper children
Red = Harper in-laws
Green = Harper grandchildren
*Note: Thelma's mother was shown on two occasions on the show (once in a flashback and once as a ghost, played both times by Vicki Lawrence), but her name wasn't revealed. There were at least two Crowley brothers (mentioned in passing in "Double Standard" and "Mama with the Golden Arm"); one was named Clyde ("Pomp and Circumstance"). A cousin named Cora is seen in "There's No Place Like...No Place", and an Uncle Oscar is mentioned in "Mama Gets the Bird", but it is not known if he was from Thelma's side of the family or her husband Carl's. Eunice also mentions having a son named Billy, but Billy's whereabouts are unknown in Mama's Family.

Recurring characters
Carl Harper, a predominantly unseen character (although once played by Ken Berry in flashback scenes of the series finale), he is the deceased husband of Mama and father of Ellen, Eunice, and Vinton. While he's occasionally made mention of especially by Thelma, he only appears in flashback episodes. Though even in flashbacks, he's unseen for the most part, as he's usually only portrayed in voice as a man who spent the vast majority of his life nested on the toilet in the bathroom with the door closed. In fact, Carl died on the toilet. He's characterized as a grouch who screams from the bathroom about how he doesn't want to be interrupted during his long hours on the toilet, even for emergencies.
Effie Crowley Harper, Thelma's cousin (in season 2) and later her sister-in-law (in season 4), known for her rum balls deceptively filled with alcohol bestowed to the family. She lives in nearby Ceciltown on a farm. Played by Dorothy Van.
Reverend Lloyd Meechum, the Harpers' henpecked minister. Played by Earl Boen.
Alberta Meechum, Reverend Meechum's stuck-up, catty wife and a perennial thorn in the side of Thelma Harper. Played by Anne Haney
Mayor Alvin Tutweiler, the mayor of Raytown and Ellen's boyfriend. Played by Alan Oppenheimer.
Eddie Edwards, a TV personality in Raytown, who hosts such programs as Good Morning, Raytown and the Grandma USA pageant. Played by Wayne Morton.
Clive Montaigne, the head of the community theater, who fashions himself an actor just as important as actors in New York and London. The people in town treat him like a mini-celebrity, despite only running the community theater. Played by Rod McCary.
Luann Fayette, Naomi Harper's flamboyant and flirtatious best friend. She is only seen once but mentioned several times. Played by Jennifer Richards.
Mr. and Mrs. Boylen, Iola's elderly, predominantly unseen parents, who live across the street from Thelma. Not much is mentioned of her father, but her mother is often alluded to as a grotesquely large, temperamental, T.V.-watching invalid. Although they are largely unseen, Mama once called out a greeting to an elderly woman living next to her whom she referred to as "Ms. Boylen." This was a brief moment from the episode "Mama Learns To Drive," from the show's first life (season 2), prior to the appearances of Iola.
Roselle Huplander, an obese acquaintance of Thelma and Iola who is never seen. On a few occasions Thelma has spoken to her over the phone, but more often she is gossiped about by Thelma and Iola. Once, at a church fair, she gave Vint a black eye when he suggested that she weighed 309 pounds at the "Guess Your Weight" booth he was running. The character was named after the show’s wig designer, Roselle Friedland.
Dwayne and T-Boy, Bubba's best friends, played by Beau Bishop and Grant Heslov respectively. More spoken of than ever seen.
Mr. Alan Hanson, an intelligent, laid-back night-school teacher of Thelma and Bubba and love interest of Thelma Harper. Her relationship with him is unceremoniously discontinued in the series, however. Played by Joseph Campanella.
Amy Johnson, girlfriend of Bubba Higgins. Played by Amy Benedict.
Lolly Purdue, member and later president (succeeding Thelma) of the Church Ladies League. Revealed to be illiterate. Played first by Doris Hess, then Marge Redmond.
Officer Sneed, an extremely youthful-looking, strange police officer. Played by Allan David Fox.
Claude Cainmaker, Vint's seedy friend, who is always thinking up schemes. Played by Geoffrey Lewis.
Alistair Quince, the erudite host who introduced Mama's Family during the first and second seasons. The character was a takeoff on Alistair Cooke, who at the time introduced Masterpiece Theater each week on PBS. These intros were edited out when the show went into syndication but have been restored in the DVDs released by StarVista/Time Life. The character first appeared as Alistair Cookie on The Carol Burnett Show. Played by Harvey Korman.
Mama Crowley (played by Vicki Lawrence), Thelma's dearly departed mother, who only appeared in flashback sequences or by photo. She had a dismal, forbidding appearance, constantly grimacing and wearing nothing but dark, somber dresses. She first appeared in the first NBC incarnation of the show (episode "Mama's Birthday") as a burly elderly woman with a surly nature. In this appearance, she spoke to a middle-aged Thelma over the phone. The conversation ended with Mama Crowley hanging up on Thelma, following Thelma's resentful protests against Mama Crowley's contemptuous remarks about her husband, Carl. Mama Crowley's second appearance was in the show's reincarnation in first-run syndication (episode "My Mama, Myself"). In this appearance, Mama Crowley appeared as a slender ghost, haunting Mama. Taking on a menacing, overbearing, and harassing nature, she spent the entirety of the episode relentlessly criticizing, insulting, ordering about and hissing at Thelma. On more than one episode of the show's second life, Thelma alluded to needing forbearance in dealing with her mother's harassing, censorious nature growing up. For example, in the episode "Mama Makes Three," Thelma visited a psychiatrist with Vinton and Naomi. During the session, she began ranting and raving about her childhood and her mother, even referring to Mama Crowley as a "complainful stubborn old biddy." Vinton has also described Mama Crowley as being "mean" in her treatment of him, Eunice, and Ellen when they were all children.
Church Ladies League, also known as CLL. Their motto is "Gentle Helpers; Kind and Good" and First Lady Alberta Meechum served as the first president. Members include Thelma Harper, Lolly Purdue, Iola Boylen, Roselle Huplander, Inez, and Florence. The association was first mentioned in "Where's There's Smoke", when Mama was nominated for president of the Church Ladies League. It was mentioned later in the episodes "Reading the Riot Act", "Ladies Choice" and "Mama's Medicine Show". Their award bears the name "Church Ladies League Woman of the Year."

Episodes

Altogether, Mama's Family had six seasons consisting of 130 episodes. The show's first life consisted of thirty-five episodes, making for two seasons. The show's second life consisted of ninety-five episodes, making for four seasons.

Favorites of Vicki Lawrence
On September 30, 2013, Vicki Lawrence was asked what her favorite episodes of the series are:

 Lawrence answered that among the early seasons, her favorite is the episode "The Wedding (Part 2)." Her reason for favoring this episode is the big names featured in it. She listed Carol Burnett, Harvey Korman, Betty White, Ken Berry and Dorothy Lyman. In admiration, Lawrence remarked, "How much help does one girl get?" and "It's just an amazing supporting cast. Dear God, Carol was funny in that show!"
 Lawrence has described another favorite from the early seasons as the episode "Rashomama," which is a takeoff on the Japanese film Rashomon. The episode is about Mama getting hit with a kettle in the kitchen and it is her, Betty, Dorothy, and Carol. At the emergency room, the three of them all have different versions of what happened to Mama. Lawrence explained, "We redo the scene three different ways, and it's pretty funny."
 As other episode favorites, Lawrence has named "Family Feud" and "Mama on Jeopardy!" Lawrence stated she loved having this dysfunctional family sent out into the real world. In particular, she enjoyed the inclusion of game shows because "people know the format of these shows so perfectly, and to watch this crazy family get stuck in that format was really fun to me. Probably because I also love game shows so much."
 As another episode favorite, Lawrence named "The Love Letter." Stated Lawrence, "It was a great episode, a record-holder actually. I think Bubba writes a love letter for Vint, who is having some problems with Naomi. In the course of the 22-minute episode, everybody thinks that the love letter is meant for them. Mama thinks it is for her from the repair guy who is there. Iola is sure Vint has written it to her. The show actually ran 22 minutes with no costume changes or anything. I remember the night that we did it. We did it in 22 minutes and were out at 7:25, and our director said, 'Good night, you're done!'" Lawrence added, "Honestly, I have to say, by the time we finished the show, we had it down to a four-day workweek, so I kind of felt like we got paid to play dress up really."

Ratings
 Season 1: #59
 Season 2: #66

Home media

On September 26, 2006, Warner Bros. Television released season 1 of Mama's Family on DVD. The DVD release features the syndicated versions of the episodes, which edits roughly three minutes from what originally aired. Warner Bros. claimed to only own the rights to the syndicated form.

Due to issues relating to ownership rights between the show's production companies, Mama's Family for a long time had difficulties coming out on DVD, with only its first season available for many years.

However, in May 2013, it was announced that StarVista Entertainment would release all 6 seasons of the sitcom to DVD, as well as a complete series box set, which was available only through the StarVista website. Most of the original unedited versions, dubbed "The Joe Hamilton Cuts," were presented on DVD. Included with the package were extras of over 10 hours of bonus material, as well as a new cast reunion with Vicki Lawrence and the show's syndicated cast members. In addition, StarVista offered a "Signature" collection of the entire series, autographed by Vicki Lawrence, which was limited to 500 copies.

In the fall of 2013, Star Vista began releasing individual season sets, Seasons 1 & 2 were released on September 10, 2013, followed by season 3 on February 25, 2014. Season 4 was released on June 24, 2014, Season 5 on September 23, 2014 and the sixth and final season was released on February 10, 2015.
In conjunction with the complete seasons, Star Vista released a "best-of" single-disc unit for each season. Selected by Vicki Lawrence, each release has 6 (season 1 has 7) of her personal favorite episodes from each season.

Awards and nominations

Primetime Emmy Awards

TV Land Awards

Young Artist Awards

Syndication
After the series finale in 1990, the entire series (including the NBC episodes) was placed in off-network syndication, airing in most cities every weekday.  Mama's Family also ran on TBS from January 1997 until August 2006 premiering weekday mornings.  In October 1998, TBS aired a full hour of Mama’s Family weekday afternoons at 6:05 pm/et and then moved the show to 4:05pm/et in November 1998. That same month, ION Television (formerly the PAX network) began airing reruns of the series. The show aired Monday through Friday at 8:00 to 9:00 pm from 2006 to 2008. ET.

In December 2006, CMT began re-airing the series.

Mama's Family currently airs on Logo TV and MeTV.

International versions
An Italian version called La mamma è sempre la mamma (Mom is always mom) aired on Odeon TV in 1988.

Post-television show appearances of Thelma Harper/Mama

 Vicki Lawrence has been reprising her role of Mama in her untelevised touring stage show, entitled Vicki Lawrence and Mama: A Two-Woman Show. In the show, Lawrence first performs stand-up comedy as herself, then comes out in character as Mama, giving her opinions on modern-day topics. During the break between the two acts, the audience is shown bloopers from the syndicated seasons of the series. Lawrence also sings the lyrics she wrote for "Bless My Happy Home," the show's theme song, which were omitted from the version used on-air.
 Lawrence has also appeared in her Mama role on several Halloween-themed episodes of the 1998–2004 run of Hollywood Squares with Tom Bergeron at the helm.
 Lawrence appeared on RuPaul's Drag Race in the "All-Stars" season as Mama in the skit "RuPaul’s Gaff-In."
 Lawrence appeared on The Queen Latifah Show as Mama the Monday after Mother's Day 2014 in a comical skit that aired prior to each commercial break. Lawrence also appeared on the show 8 days later alongside two other well-known actresses to speak about her role of Mama and her personal life.
 Lawrence resurrected the character in promos for reruns of Mama's Family on the MeTV channel in 2015–2016.
 Lawrence resurrected the character during the 2015 and 2016 TV seasons of The Doctors, where she talked about health-related issues.

References

Bibliography 
 Mama for President: Good Lord, Why Not?, by Thelma Harper, as told to Vicki Lawrence and Monty Aidem, Thomas Nelson, 2008. 
 "Mama's Family": The Unofficial Episode Viewing Guide, by Andrew Whitenack, ANDDAR Publications, 2011.

External links

 
 
 The Mama's Family Site
 

1983 American television series debuts
1984 American television series endings
1986 American television series debuts
1990 American television series endings
1980s American sitcoms
1990s American sitcoms
American television spin-offs
English-language television shows
First-run syndicated television programs in the United States
NBC original programming
Television series about dysfunctional families
Television series about single parent families
Television series by Warner Bros. Television Studios
American television series revived after cancellation
Television series based on comedy sketches
Television shows set in Missouri
Television series by Lorimar-Telepictures